The San Antonio XLR8 was an American soccer club based in San Antonio, Texas that was a member of the Lone Star Soccer Alliance.

Year-by-year

Sports teams in San Antonio
Defunct soccer clubs in Texas
Lone Star Soccer Alliance teams